Jonathan David "Doc" Schneider (born April 25, 1987, in Massapequa, New York) is a goaltender formerly of the Hamilton Nationals of Major League Lacrosse.

Early life
Schneider, who is Jewish, acquired the nickname 'Doc' from his family.  He is the son of Roni and Irwin Schneider.

College
Previously he was the goaltender for the UMass Minutemen where he made the 2006 NCAA All Tournament Team and was a 2007 candidate and 2009 finalist for the Tewaaraton Trophy.  His 548 career saves rank him in fourth place at the school.

In July 2008 the Jewish Sports Review named Schneider a First-Team Jewish All-American.

MLL

References

External links

Major League Lacrosse players
American lacrosse players
1987 births
Living people
Jewish American sportspeople
Lacrosse goaltenders
UMass Minutemen lacrosse players
Hamilton Nationals players
People from Massapequa, New York
21st-century American Jews